The following outline is provided as an overview of and topical guide to Japan:

Japan – an island nation in East Asia, located in the Pacific Ocean. It lies to the east of the Sea of Japan, China, North Korea, South Korea and Russia, stretching from the Sea of Okhotsk in the north to the East China Sea and Taiwan in the south. The characters that make up Japan's name mean "sun-origin" (because it lies to the east of nearby countries), which is why Japan is sometimes referred to as the "Land of the Rising Sun". Japan is an archipelago of 6,852 islands. The four largest islands are Honshu, Hokkaido, Kyushu, and Shikoku, which together comprise about ninety-seven percent of Japan's land area.

General reference 
 Pronunciation: 
  or 
 Common endonyms: 
 Official endonym: 
 Adjectival: Japanese
 Etymology: Name of Japan
 International rankings of Japan
 ISO country codes: JP, JPN, 392
 ISO region codes: ISO 3166-2:JP
 Internet country code top-level domain: .jp

Geography of Japan 

 Japan is: an island country and archipelago of 6,852 islands, shaped like the lowercase letter J.
 Location:
 Pacific Ocean
 Northern Hemisphere and Eastern Hemisphere
 Asia
 East Asia
 Time zone: Japan Standard Time (UTC+09)
 Extreme points of Japan
 High: Mount Fuji 
 Low: Hachirōgata 
 Land boundaries: none
 Coastline: 
 Population of Japan: 125,950,000 people - 11th most populous country
 Area of Japan:   - 62nd largest country
 Atlas of Japan
 Addressing system in Japan
 Historic provinces of Japan
 Japan Standard Time

Environment of Japan 

 Climate of Japan
 Climate change in Japan
 Environmental issues in Japan
 Ecoregions in Japan
 Energy in Japan
 Geology of Japan
 National parks of Japan
 Tsunami
 Wildlife of Japan
 Flora of Japan
 Fauna of Japan
 Birds of Japan
 Mammals of Japan

Geographic features of Japan 

 Glaciers of Japan
 Islands of Japan
 Lakes of Japan
 Mountains of Japan
 Volcanoes in Japan
 Rivers of Japan
 Waterfalls of Japan
 Three Views of Japan
 List of World Heritage Sites in Japan

Regions of Japan 

The four main islands of Japan are:

Hokkaido
Honshu
Kyushu
Shikoku

Major regions of Japan include:
 Hokkaido (the island of Hokkaido and nearby islands, largest city Sapporo)
 Tōhoku region (northern Honshu, largest city Sendai)
 Kantō region (eastern Honshu, largest cities Tokyo and Yokohama)
 Nanpō Islands: part of Tokyo Metropolis
 Chūbu region (central Honshu, including Mount Fuji), sometimes divided into:
 Hokuriku region (northwestern Chūbu)
 Kōshin'etsu region (northeastern Chūbu, largest city Nagano)
 Tōkai region (southern Chūbu, largest city Nagoya, Hamamatsu, and Shizuoka)
 Kansai or Kinki region (west-central Honshu, largest cities Osaka, Kobe, and Kyoto)
 Chūgoku region (western Honshu, largest city Hiroshima, and Okayama)
 Shikoku (island, largest city Matsuyama, and Takamatsu)
 Kyushu (island, largest city Fukuoka) which includes:
 Ryukyu Islands, including Okinawa

Ecoregions of Japan

Administrative divisions of Japan 
 Administrative division types
 Regions of Japan (unofficial)
 Prefectures of Japan
 Subprefectures of Japan
 Districts of Japan
 Municipalities of Japan
 Wards of Japan

Prefectures of Japan 

From north to south (numbering in ISO 3166-2:JP order), the prefectures of Japan and their commonly associated regions are:

Karafuto, a portion of the island of Sakhalin north of Hokkaido (not shown on the map), was part of Japan from 1907 until World War II. The entire island is now governed by Russia.

Municipalities of Japan 

 Cities of Japan
 Capital of Japan: Tokyo
 Cities designated by government ordinance
 Cities, by population
 Towns of Japan
 Villages of Japan

Demography of Japan 

 Aging of Japan

Government and politics of Japan 

 Form of government: parliamentary multi-party representative democratic constitutional monarchy
 Capital of Japan: Tokyo
 Elections in Japan
 Imperial House of Japan (Imperial family)
 Imperial Guard of Japan
 Imperial Household Law
 Imperial Household Agency
 Civil service of Japan
 Japanese public corporations
 Independent administrative institutions of Japan
 Political parties in Japan
 Government-business relations in Japan
 Human rights in Japan
 Mass media and politics in Japan
 Monetary and fiscal policy of Japan
 Political funding in Japan
 Political extremism in Japan
 Taxation in Japan
 Health care system in Japan
 Social welfare in Japan

Branches of the government of Japan

Executive branch of the government of Japan 

 Symbol of state: Naruhito, Emperor of Japan
 Controversies regarding the role of the Emperor of Japan
 Emperors of the past
 Head of state: de facto head of state of Japan is the head of government, the Prime Minister (see below)
 Head of government: Shinzō Abe, Prime Minister of Japan
  (Office and residence of the Prime Minister)
 Prime Ministers of the past
 Cabinet of Japan
 Ministries of Japan
 National Public Safety Commission
 Ministry of Internal Affairs and Communications
 Ministry of Justice
 Ministry of Foreign Affairs
 Ministry of Finance (Japan)
 Ministry of Education, Culture, Sports, Science and Technology
 Ministry of Health, Labour and Welfare
 Ministry of Agriculture, Forestry and Fisheries
 Ministry of Economy, Trade and Industry
 Ministry of Land, Infrastructure and Transport
 Ministry of the Environment
 Ministry of Defence

Legislative branch of the government of Japan 

 Diet of Japan (bicameral legislature of Japan)
 House of Councillors
 House of Representatives of Japan
 National Diet Building

Judicial branch of the government of Japan 
 Judicial system of Japan
 Supreme Court of Japan

Foreign relations of Japan 

 Diplomatic missions of Japan
 Foreign aid institutions of Japan
 Foreign policy of Japan
 Japan's non-nuclear weapons policy
 Whaling in Japan

International organization membership of Japan 
Japan is a member of:

African Development Bank (AfDB) (non-regional member)
Asian Development Bank (ADB)
Asia-Pacific Economic Cooperation (APEC)
Asia-Pacific Telecommunity (APT)
Association of Southeast Asian Nations (ASEAN) (dialogue partner)
Association of Southeast Asian Nations Regional Forum (ARF)
Australia Group
Bank for International Settlements (BIS)
Colombo Plan (CP)
Council of Europe (CE) (observer)
East Asia Summit (EAS)
European Bank for Reconstruction and Development (EBRD)
Energy Charter
European Organization for Nuclear Research (CERN) (observer)
Food and Agriculture Organization (FAO)
Group of Five (G5)
Group of Seven (G7)
Group of Eight (G8)
Group of Ten (G10)
Group of Twenty Finance Ministers and Central Bank Governors (G20)
Inter-American Development Bank (IADB)
International Atomic Energy Agency (IAEA)
International Bank for Reconstruction and Development (IBRD)
International Chamber of Commerce (ICC)
International Civil Aviation Organization (ICAO)
International Criminal Court (ICCt)
International Criminal Police Organization (Interpol)
International Development Association (IDA)
International Energy Agency (IEA)
International Energy Charter
International Federation of Red Cross and Red Crescent Societies (IFRCS)
International Finance Corporation (IFC)
International Fund for Agricultural Development (IFAD)
International Hydrographic Organization (IHO)
International Labour Organization (ILO)
International Maritime Organization (IMO)
International Mobile Satellite Organization (IMSO)
International Monetary Fund (IMF)
International Olympic Committee (IOC)
International Organization for Migration (IOM)
International Organization for Standardization (ISO)
International Red Cross and Red Crescent Movement (ICRM)
International Telecommunication Union (ITU)
International Telecommunications Satellite Organization (ITSO)
International Trade Union Confederation (ITUC)
Inter-Parliamentary Union (IPU)
Latin American Integration Association (LAIA)
Multilateral Investment Guarantee Agency (MIGA)
Nuclear Energy Agency (NEA)
Nuclear Suppliers Group (NSG)
Organisation for Economic Co-operation and Development (OECD)
Organization for Security and Cooperation in Europe (OSCE) (partner)
Organisation for the Prohibition of Chemical Weapons (OPCW)
Organization of American States (OAS) (observer)
Pacific Islands Forum (PIF) (partner)
Paris Club
Permanent Court of Arbitration (PCA)
South Asian Association for Regional Cooperation (SAARC) (observer)
Southeast European Cooperative Initiative (SECI) (observer)
United Nations (UN)
United Nations Conference on Trade and Development (UNCTAD)
United Nations Disengagement Observer Force (UNDOF)
United Nations Educational, Scientific, and Cultural Organization (UNESCO)
United Nations High Commissioner for Refugees (UNHCR)
United Nations Industrial Development Organization (UNIDO)
United Nations Institute for Training and Research (UNITAR)
United Nations Relief and Works Agency for Palestine Refugees in the Near East (UNRWA)
Universal Postal Union (UPU)
World Confederation of Labour (WCL)
World Customs Organization (WCO)
World Federation of Trade Unions (WFTU)
World Health Organization (WHO)
World Intellectual Property Organization (WIPO)
World Meteorological Organization (WMO)
World Tourism Organization (UNWTO)
World Trade Organization (WTO)
World Veterans Federation
Zangger Committee (ZC)

Law and order of Japan 

 Attorneys in Japan
 Capital punishment in Japan
 Civil Code of Japan
 Constitution of Japan
 Criminal justice system of Japan
 Crime in Japan
 Cannabis in Japan
 Juries in Japan
 Organized crime in Japan
 Human rights in Japan
 Freedom of the press in Japan
 Freedom of religion in Japan
 LGBT rights in Japan
 Law enforcement in Japan
 Penal system of Japan
 Public order and internal security in Japan

Military of Japan 

 Japan's non-nuclear policy
 Japan Self-Defense Forces
 Army of Japan: Japan Ground Self-Defense Force
 Navy of Japan: Japan Maritime Self-Defense Force
 Air force Japan: Japan Air Self-Defense Force
 Military history of Japan
 National security of Japan

History of Japan 

 History of Japan by year
 History of Tokyo
 Japanese nationalism
 Military history of Japan
 Samurai
 
 Ninja
 Japanese militarism
 Pacific Ocean theater of World War II
 Attack on Pearl Harbor
 Kamikaze
 Atomic bombings of Hiroshima and Nagasaki
 Surrender of Japan
 Aftermath of World War II: Occupation of Japan
 Naval history

History of Japan by period 

 Paleolithic
 Jōmon period
 Yayoi period
 Yamato period
 Kofun period
 Asuka period
 Nara period
 Heian period
 Kamakura period
 Mongol invasions of Japan
 Kenmu Restoration
 Muromachi period
 Nanboku-chō period
 Sengoku period
 Azuchi–Momoyama period
 Nanban trade
 Edo period
 Genroku period
 Genroku culture
 
 Meiji period
 Meiji Restoration
 Empire of Japan
 Taishō period
 Japanese expansion (1941–42)
 Japan during World War I
 Shōwa period
 Japanese militarism
 Occupation of Japan
 Post-occupation Japan
 Heisei period

Culture of Japan 

 Cultural Properties of Japan
 Japanese aesthetics
 Japanese calendar
 Etiquette in Japan
 Japanese tea ceremony
 Funerals in Japan
 Gambling in Japan
 Japanese martial arts
 Media of Japan
 Japanese museums
 List of museums in Japan
 Television in Japan
 Pornography in Japan
 Japanese mobile phone culture
 Japanese philosophy
 National symbols of Japan
 Imperial Regalia of Japan
 Imperial Seal of Japan
 Flag of Japan
  (National anthem of Japan)
 National Treasures of Japan
 Public bathing
 
 
 Popular culture in Japan
 Cuteness in Japanese culture
 Prostitution in Japan
 Records of Japan
 Japanese values
 Westernization
 Americanization
 World Heritage Sites in Japan

Architecture of Japan 

 Japanese Buddhist architecture
 Buddhist temples in Japan
 Hōryū-ji
 Tōdai-ji
 Enryaku-ji
 Mount Kōya

 Castles in Japan

 Himeji Castle
 Matsumoto Castle
 Osaka Castle
 Housing in Japan
 Okinawan architecture
 Shinto shrine
 Izumo-taisha
 Usa Shrine

Art of Japan 

 Music of Japan
 Shamisen
 Taiko
 Gagaku
 Koto
 Enka
 J-pop
 Karaoke
 Japanese traditional dance
 
 
 
 Calligraphy
 Dogū
 Dōtaku
 Haniwa
 Japonisme
 Kagami
 Kakemono
 Kanō school
 Magatama
 Manga
 Origami
 Imari porcelain
 Pottery
 Traditional Pottery
 Ukiyo-e
 Yamato-e
 Cinema of Japan
 Anime
 Studio Ghibli
 Directors
 Shōhei Imamura
 Takeshi Kitano
 Hirokazu Koreeda
 Akira Kurosawa
 Takashi Miike
 Hayao Miyazaki
 Kenji Mizoguchi
 Mikio Naruse
 Nagisa Oshima
 Yasujirō Ozu
 Isao Takahata
 Films
 Godzilla
 In the Realm of the Senses
 Kagemusha
 Rashōmon
 Ring
 Seven Samurai
 Japanese literature
 Japanese writers
 Kojiki
 Nihon Shoki
 The Tale of Genji
 Japanese literary genres
 Monogatari
 Haiku
 Waka
 Theatre in Japan
 Kabuki
 Bunraku
 Noh
 Kyōgen

Cuisine of Japan 

 
 Japanese regional cuisine
 Bento
 Daikon
 Mochi
 Ramen
 Sake
 Sashimi
 Sushi
 Tempura
 Wasabi
 Japanese desserts and sweets
 Japanese dishes
 Japanese snacks

Cultural icons of Japan 

 Bonsai
 Japanese dragon
 Japanese gardens
 Geisha
 Maiko
 Karate
 Black belt
 Kimono
 Ninja
 Rising Sun Flag
 Sakura
 Sumo
 Sushi

Fashion in Japan 

 Traditional clothing
 Kimono
 
 
 
 
 
 Traditional footwear:
 Geta
 Zōri
 
 
 
 Hakama
 School uniforms in Japan
 Japanese street fashion
 Aristocrat

Holidays and festivals of Japan 

 Golden Week
 Shōwa Day
 Constitution Memorial Day
 Greenery Day

Homes in Japan 

 Furnishings
 Butsudan
 Byōbu
 Chabudai
 Furo
 Futon
 Kamidana
 Kotatsu
 Ikebana
 Sudare
 Tansu
 Toilets in Japan
 Zabuton
 Minka
 Rooms
 Japanese kitchen
 Washitsu
 Fusuma
 Shōji
 Tatami (flooring)
 Tokonoma

Language in Japan 

 Japanese language
 Historical kana usage
 Japanese grammar
 Japanese phonology
 Romanization of Japanese
 Japanese dialects
 Kansai dialect
 Saga-ben
 Wasei-eigo (Japanese English)
 Ryukyuan languages
 Amami
 Kikai
 Okinawan
 Kunigami
 Yoron
 Miyako
 Yaeyama
 Yonaguni
 Foreign Variations
 Franponais
 Engrish
 Writing systems of Japan
 Kanji
 Hiragana
 Katakana
 Furigana

People of Japan 

 Japanese celebrities
 Japanese diaspora
 Elderly people in Japan
 Japanese family
 Homosexuality in Japan
 Japanese names
 Women in Japan

Ethnicity in Japan 

 Ethnic issues in Japan
 Ainu people
 Burakumin
 Dekasegi
 Ryukyuan people
 Yamato people

Stereotypes in Japan 

 Geisha
 Freeter
 Hikikomori
 Kogaru
 Otaku
 Yakuza
 Burakumin

Religion in Japan 

 Buddhism in Japan
 Nichiren Buddhism
 Shingon
 Tendai
 Pure Land Buddhism
 Zen
 Shinto
 Christianity in Japan
 Protestantism in Japan
 Roman Catholicism in Japan
 Japanese Orthodox Church
 Judaism in Japan
 Islam in Japan
 Ahmadiyya in Japan
 Neo-Confucianism in Japan
 Japanese new religions
 Hinduism in Japan
 Japanese mythology

Sports and gaming in Japan 

 
 Sports
 Aikido
 Baseball in Japan
 Association football in Japan
 Kendo
 Puroresu (professional wrestling)
 Sumo
 Traditional games
 Go
 Shogi
 Mahjong
 Hanafuda

Economy and infrastructure of Japan 

Economy of Japan
 Economic rank, by nominal GDP (2007): 2nd (second)
 Agriculture, forestry, and fishing in Japan
 Automotive industry in Japan
 Bank of Japan
 Buildings and structures in Japan
 Tallest buildings and structures in Japan
 Companies of Japan
 Communications in Japan
 Internet in Japan
 Construction industry of Japan
 Consumer electronics industry of Japan
Currency of Japan: Yen
ISO 4217: JPY
 Department stores in Japan
 Defense industry of Japan
 Economic history of Japan
 Economic relations of Japan
 Energy in Japan
 Nuclear power in Japan
 Financial system of Japan
 Health care in Japan

 Labor market of Japan
 Manufacturing industries of Japan
 Monetary and fiscal policy of Japan
 Mining in Japan
 National parks of Japan
 Private enterprise in Japan
 Research and development in Japan
 Standard of living in Japan
 Trade policy of Japan
 Trade and services in Japan
 Tourism in Japan
 Visa policy of Japan

 Transport in Japan
 Airports in Japan
 Expressways of Japan
 National highways of Japan
 Shinkansen
 Tokyo Metro
 Rail transport in Japan
 Water supply and sanitation in Japan

Education in Japan 

 History of education in Japan
 Japanese history textbook controversies
 Juku (Cram School)
 Language minority students in Japanese classrooms
 Romanization of Japanese
 School uniforms in Japan
 Yutori education

Structure of education in Japan 
 Elementary schools in Japan
 Secondary education in Japan
 Higher education in Japan

Health in Japan 
Health in Japan
 Smoking in Japan

Science and technology of Japan 

 Science and technology in Japan
 Japan Aerospace Exploration Agency
 Research and development in Japan
 Japanese robotics

See also 

List of international rankings
List of Japan-related topics
Member state of the Group of Twenty Finance Ministers and Central Bank Governors
Member states of the United Nations
Migration in Japan
Outline of Asia
Outline of geography
Tourism in Japan

Notes

References

External links

Official
 Kantei.go.jp—Official prime ministerial and cabinet site
 Kunaicho.go.jp—Official site of the Imperial family.
 Ministry of Foreign Affairs—Detailed papers on Japan's foreign policy, education programs, culture and life.
 Shugi-in.go.jp—Official site of the House of Representatives
 National Diet Library (English)

Media
 NHK Online
 Kyodo News
 Yomiuri Shimbun (English)
 Asahi Shimbun (English)
 The Japan Times

Tourism
Japan National Tourist Organization

Other
 CIA World Factbook—Japan
 Encyclopædia Britannica's Japan portal site
 Guardian Unlimited—Special Report: Japan
 
  containing the 1889 and 1946 Constitutions

Japan
Japan